Martin Němec (born 1974) is a Paralympian athlete from Czech Republic competing mainly in category F55 throwing events.

Martin has competed and won medals at three Paralympic Games. In 2000 in Sydney he won a gold medal in the F55 discus and a silver medal in F55 shot put. Four years later in Athens he competed in the F55-56 javelin and F56 shot put and won the F55 discus gold medal. In 2008 Summer Paralympics in Beijing he competed in the F55/56 discus and won his fourth Paralympic medal, a bronze, in the F55/56 shot put.

External links
 
 South Bohemian University in České Budějovice entry

Paralympic athletes of the Czech Republic
Athletes (track and field) at the 2000 Summer Paralympics
Athletes (track and field) at the 2004 Summer Paralympics
Athletes (track and field) at the 2008 Summer Paralympics
Paralympic gold medalists for the Czech Republic
Paralympic silver medalists for the Czech Republic
Paralympic bronze medalists for the Czech Republic
Living people
1974 births
World record holders in Paralympic athletics
Wheelchair category Paralympic competitors
Czech male shot putters
Czech male discus throwers
Medalists at the 2000 Summer Paralympics
Medalists at the 2004 Summer Paralympics
Medalists at the 2008 Summer Paralympics
Paralympic medalists in athletics (track and field)
Wheelchair discus throwers
Wheelchair shot putters
Paralympic discus throwers
Paralympic shot putters